Cephalota elegans is a tiger beetle species in the genus Cephalota. European-Siberian steppe species. Body length 12–15 mm. Top copper or bronze-green with a white pattern on elytra. Legs and underparts with a metallic sheen. Head with powerful long jagged mandibles. Beetles and larvae are typical diurnal predators. Beetles fly well and run fast. Larvae live in vertical mink.

References 

Cicindelidae
Beetles described in 1823
Beetles of Europe